Barbara Daniels may refer to:
 Barbara Daniels (cricketer)
 Barbara Daniels (soprano)